Stars of Tomorrow is an Aruban reality-drama television series that premiered on ATV (Aruba) on May 5, 2010. The series was created and is largely written by Ben Steel and explores the life of a group of young actors in Aruba with acting aspirations.

Creation
The series was created by Australian actor and director Ben Steel shortly after he relocated to Aruba in 2009. Steel partnered with local artist and producer Elvis Lopez from Ateliers '89, an Aruban arts foundation. The series was commissioned by Aruban broadcaster ATV (Aruba) as a way to develop local acting and directing talent in the region.

Workshop
The participants of the television program were first involved in several screen acting and screen directing workshops. These workshops provided essential skills for the participants that would later come into use when they had to make and star in their very own episode. Cameras followed the participants as they developed, and sometimes failed.

Episodes
Episode 1 - Acting Bootcamp - Follows the participants through an intensive acting training program.

Episode 2 - Behind the Scenes - Behind the Scenes as the participants struggle to develop their screen skills and film their TV show.

Episode 3 - Walk in my Shoes - Trevor doesn't understand women very much, until one day he starts waking up in women's bodies!

Red carpet premiere
A red carpet gala premiere of the final episode was held at Cas Di Cultura on May 17, 2010.

Media partners
The two main Media Partners of the television program were ATV (Aruba) and Cool FM (Aruba).

References

External links

Communications in Aruba
2010 television series debuts